Fisher's Paradise, also known as Paradise Point , is a historic home located near Lewes, Sussex County, Delaware. The main house dates to about 1780, and is a -story, three bay, wood frame dwelling sheathed in cedar shingles.  It has gable roof with dormers.  The kitchen wing is the sole remaining portion of the original 1740s house that is incorporated in the present structure.

It was added to the National Register of Historic Places in 1972.

References

Houses on the National Register of Historic Places in Delaware
Houses completed in 1780
Houses in Lewes, Delaware
National Register of Historic Places in Sussex County, Delaware